Eusynstyela misakiensis is a tunicate that is found in the western Pacific from Japan to Indonesia.

References

Stolidobranchia
Animals described in 1972